Governor Island is an uninhabited island of the Beaver Island Group in the Falkland Islands.

Maps
 The Falkland Islands. Scale 1:401280 map. London: Edward Stanford, 1901
 Falkland Islands Explorer Map. Scale 1:365000. Ocean Explorer Maps, 2007
 Falklands Topographic Map Series. Scale 1:50000, 29 sheets. DOS 453, 1961-1979
 Falkland Islands. Scale 1:643000 Map. DOS 906. Edition 3-OS, 1998
 Map 500k--xm20-4. 1:500000 map of Weddell Island and part of West Falkland. Russian Army Maps (for the world)

References

Islands of the Falkland Islands
Uninhabited islands of the Falkland Islands